Asad Qaiser (born 15 November 1969) is a Pakistani politician. He is the former Speaker of the National Assembly of Pakistan, served from August 2018 to April 2022. He had been a member of the National Assembly of Pakistan, from August 2018 till January 2023. Previously, he was the member of the Provincial Assembly of Khyber Pakhtunkhwa from 2013 to 2018 and served as the 14th Speaker of the Khyber Pakhtunkhwa Assembly, from May 2013 to August 2018.

Early life and education
Qaiser was born on 15 November 1969 in Swabi District, Pakistan. According to The Express Tribune, he was born on 15 November 1968 in Marghuz.

He received his early education from the Government higher secondary school in Marghuz. He graduated from the University of Peshawar. He graduated from the Government Post Graduate College (Swabi) and received a degree of Bachelor of Arts.

After his graduation in 1995, he became divisional president of Pasban, a youth wing of Jamaat-e-Islami Pakistan.

Political career
Qaiser began his political career with Jamaat-e-Islami Pakistan (JI). He was elected Nazim of Kotha College Swabi as a candidate of Islami Jamiat-e-Talaba in 1984 where he served for two years.

He joined Pakistan Tehreek-e-Insaf (PTI) after its formation in 1996. The same year, he was nominated as district president of PTI. He became the president of PTI Khyber Pakhtunkhwa in 2008 where he served until 2013.

He was elected to the National Assembly of Pakistan as a candidate of PTI from Constituency NA-13 (Swabi-II) in 2013 Pakistani general election. He received 48,576 votes and defeated Attaul Haq, a candidate of Jamiat Ulema-e Islam (F) (JUI-F). In the same election, he was elected to the Provincial Assembly of Khyber Pakhtunkhwa as a candidate of PTI from Constituency PK-35 (Swabi-V). He received 14,165 votes and defeated Sajjad Ahmad, a candidate of Pakistan Muslim League (N) (PML-N). Following the election, he retained his Khyber Pakhtunkhwa assembly seat and vacated the National Assembly one. On 30 May 2013, he was elected unopposed as the 14th Speaker of the Provincial Assembly of Khyber Pakhtunkhwa.

He was re-elected to the Provincial Assembly of Khyber Pakhtunkhwa as a candidate of PTI from Constituency PK-44 (Swabi-II) in 2018 Pakistani general election. He received 31,658 votes and defeated Gul Zamin Shah, a candidate of Awami National Party (ANP). In the same election, he was re-elected to the National Assembly as a candidate of PTI from Constituency NA-18 (Swabi-I). He received 78,970 votes and defeated Maulana Fazal Ali Haqqani. Following his election, he abandoned his provincial assembly seat PK-44  (Swabi-II) in favor of the national assembly seat NA-18 (Swabi-I).

On 10 August 2018, he was nominated by PTI for the office of the Speaker of the National Assembly of Pakistan. On 15 August 2018, he was elected Speaker of the National Assembly of Pakistan. He received 176 votes against 146 votes of Syed Khurshid Ahmed Shah. He resigned from his office on 9 April 2022 prior to a vote of no confidence in Prime Minister Imran Khan.

Personal life
On 30 April 2020, Qaiser tested positive COVID-19 during the coronavirus pandemic in Pakistan.

References

Living people
1969 births
Khyber Pakhtunkhwa MPAs 2013–2018
Pakistani MNAs 2018–2023
Speakers of the Provincial Assembly of Khyber Pakhtunkhwa
Speakers of the National Assembly of Pakistan
Jamaat-e-Islami Pakistan politicians
Pakistan Tehreek-e-Insaf MNAs
People from Swabi District
University of Peshawar alumni
Government Post Graduate College, Swabi alumni